The True Jacob is a 1931 German comedy film directed by Hans Steinhoff and starring Ralph Arthur Roberts, Anny Ahlers, and Felix Bressart. It is based on a play by Franz Arnold and Ernst Bach which has been adapted into numerous films.

The film's sets were designed by the art director Franz Schroedter.

Cast
Ralph Arthur Roberts as Peter Struwe
Anny Ahlers as Yvette
Felix Bressart as Böcklein
Hansi Arnstaedt as Mila
Paul Henckels as Geheimrat Spülpnagel
Margot Walter as Lotte
Viktor de Kowa as James
Julius Falkenstein as Count Birkstädt
 as Anna
Harry Halm as Fred
Gertrud Wolle as student
Anna Müller-Lincke as Elise
Wilhelm Diegelmann as Portier
Igo Guttmann as Ein Sänger

See also
Oh, Daddy! (1935)
One Night Apart (1950)
The True Jacob (1960)

References

External links

1931 comedy films
German comedy films
Films of the Weimar Republic
1930s German-language films
Films directed by Hans Steinhoff
German films based on plays
German black-and-white films
Films scored by Hans J. Salter
1930s German films